Rafael de Zárate y Sequera (ca. 1824 – ca. 1904) was Mayor of Ponce, Puerto Rico, from 11 June 1884 to 16 July 1886.

Mayoral term
During his two-year mayoral term, Zárate y Sequera is credited with placing fire hydrants along the route from downtown Ponce to its Port at Playa de Ponce and enlarging Calle León further up northbound, both completed in 1884. He is also credited with starting construction of Hospital Civil de Ponce on 4 June 1885. 

While Zárate Sequera did achieve these goals, the Hospital Civil was not completed, only one of its two wings was.  In addition, he had a bad temper and it did not take long before he started to lose the support of both Municipal Council members and the townspeople at large. Given this state of affairs, he presented his resignation to the Governor and, on 16 July 1886 he made the announcement that the Governor had named Elices Montes to replace him. The Municipal Council reacted by stating that, though they respected the decision of the Governor, they were disappointed as three council members, namely, Juan Mayoral, Joaquin P. Valdivieso, and Federico Leon y Cortes, were qualified for the position. In addition, it was argued, Mr. Elices Montes was "a stranger" to Ponce politics and municipal administration. As a consequence, the municipal council approved a resolution that condemned the appointment of Elices Montes for mayor.

See also

 List of Puerto Ricans
 List of mayors of Ponce, Puerto Rico

Notes

References

Further reading
 Ramon Marin. Las Fiestas Populares de Ponce. Editorial Universidad de Puerto Rico. 1994.
 Fay Fowlie de Flores. Ponce, Perla del Sur: Una Bibliografía Anotada. Second Edition. 1997. Ponce, Puerto Rico: Universidad de Puerto Rico en Ponce. p. 335. Item 1671. 
 Ponce. Presupuesto ordinario correspondiente al año económico venidero de 1884 a 85. Ponce, Puerto Rico: Tip. El Comercio, 1884. (Biblioteca del Congreso [Washington, D.C.]; Colegio Universitario Tecnológico de Ponce, CUTPO [fotocopia])

External links
 Guardia Civil española (c. 1898) (Includes military ranks in 1880s Spanish Empire.)

Mayors of Ponce, Puerto Rico
1820s births
1900s deaths
Year of death uncertain
Year of birth uncertain